Serbia is scheduled to compete at the 2023 FIBA Basketball World Cup qualification in the Europe group.

Background 

In July 2021, Serbia failed to qualify for the 2020 Summer Olympics.

Timeline

 12 October 2021: 16-man B-team roster announcement
 17–19 October 2021: B-team training camp
 15 November 2021: 24-man first window roster announced
 25–28 November 2021: First window
 15 February 2022: 24-man second window roster announced
 25–28 February 2022: Second window
 20 June 2022: 20-man third window roster announced
 30 June – 3 July 2022: Third window
 12 July 2022: 22-man fourth window roster announced
 25–28 August 2022: Fourth window
 10–13 November 2022: Fifth window
 24–27 February 2023: Sixth window

Roster 
On 22 November, he announced a 17-man roster, removing from the list seven players due to the EuroLeague schedule conflict; guards Vasilije Micić, Ognjen Jaramaz, Vanja Marinković, Nemanja Nedović, Ognjen Dobrić, forward Dejan Davidovac, and center Filip Petrušev. On 26 November, center Petrušev was re-added to the roster. Forward Alen Smailagić missed the second match due to  injury. Guard Jovan Novak, forward Marko Jagodić-Kuridža, and center Dušan Ristić made their senior debuts with the Serbian national team.

On 15 February 2022, head coach Pešić announced an initial 24-man roster for the second window games against  on 25 and 28 February. Guards Miloš Teodosić and Nikola Rebić were the only players unlisted from the 18-man first window roster, while eight new players were called in. Marko Jagodić-Kuridža was named as the captain of the Serbia team in absence of Miloš Teodosić. Guard-forwards Nikola Đurišić and Nikola Jović, both at age 18, and center Balša Koprivica made their senior debuts with the Serbian national team.

On 15 August 2022, head coach Pešić, following a cut of team captain Teodosić from the roster, announced forwards Nemanja Bjelica and Vladimir Lučić as co-captains for the second round first window.

The following a 16-man roster for the fourth window games at the 2023 FIBA Basketball World Cup qualification:

Depth chart per window 
 The 12-man roster members without playing time are in Italics.

First window 
The following is the first window depth chart for the matches on 25 to 29 November 2021 against Latvia and Belgium. 

Other 17-man roster members, guards Aleksa Uskoković, Nikola Rebić, Nikola Đurišić, forward Dalibor Ilić and center Dragan Apić, were out of the final 12-man roster for both games.

Second window 
The following is the second window depth chart for the matches on 25 to 28 February 2022 against Slovakia. 

Other 24-man roster members, guards Nemanja Nedović, Vasilije Micić, Ognjen Dobrić, forwards Dejan Davidovac, Nemanja Dangubić, Rade Zagorac, Alen Smailagić, Dejan Todorović, Dušan Beslać, Dalibor Ilić, and center Dragan Apić, were out of the final 12-man roster for both games.

Third window 
The following is the third window depth chart for the matches on 30 June to 3 July 2022 against Latvia and Belgium. 

Other 20-man roster members, guards Miloš Teodosić and Uroš Trifunović, forwards Nemanja Jović, Danilo Anđušić, Aleksa Novaković, and centers Balša Koprivica and Marko Pecarski, were out of the final 12-man roster for both games.

Fourth window 

Other 16-man roster members, guard Nemanja Nedović, and forwards Boriša Simanić and Nemanja Bjelica were out of the final 12-man roster for both games.

2021 B-team training camp 
On 12 October 2021, head coach Svetislav Pešić announced a 17-man b-team roster for a two day training camp. The roster was composed of players from domestic and ABA League clubs, excluding Crvena zvezda and Partizan. On 18 October, the Basketball Federation of Serbia canceled the b-team training camp due to health issues of head coach Pešić. The B-team roster included: Mihailo Petrović, Ilija Đoković, Marko Pecarski, Aleksa Radanov, Dalibor Ilić, Stefan Đorđević, Boriša Simanić, Mihailo Mušikić, Nikola Jović, Nikola Đurišić, Matija Belić, Vojin Medarević, Dušan Beslać, Marko Pavićević, Arijan Lakić, Zoran Paunović, and Đorđe Pažin.

Staff 

After he got appointed as an assistant coach for the Dallas Mavericks, head coach Igor Kokoškov parted ways with the Basketball Federation of Serbia as the Serbian team coach on 14 September 2021. On 28 September, the Federation hired Svetislav Pešić as the new head coach for the Serbia men's national team. On the next day, the Federation hired Dragan Tarlać as the new national team director. In November 2021, Oliver Kostić, Marko Marinović, and Nenad Trunić were named assistant coaches. In February 2022, head coach Pešić added assistant coach Vladimir Jovanović, scout Miloš Isakov Kovačević, and physiotherapist Đorđe Milošević to his staff.

Age – describes age on 25 November 2021

Source:

Uniform

Supplier: Peak
Main sponsor: Triglav
Back sponsor: Raiffeisen Bank (below number)
Shorts sponsor: mts

Exhibition games 

Serbia played one exhibition game in June 2022. The game was played behind closed doors without any game reports or statements given after the game.

Qualification

First round – Group A

As one of the 24 national teams that qualified for EuroBasket 2022, Serbia automatically qualified for the First round. Serbia was seeded in the Seed 1. The draw for the First round was held on 31 August 2021 in Mies, Switzerland. Serbia was drawn into the Group A with the Latvia, Belgium, and Slovakia. These matches was played in three windows in November 2021, February 2022, and June/July 2022 with two games played by each team in every window.

Group A is one of eight qualifiers groups of four teams. The groups will be conducted in a round-robin system, with each team playing all other teams in the respective group in home and away games. If Serbia finishes as one of the top three teams in its group, they will advance to the Second round of the FIBA Basketball World Cup qualification and will play against top three finishers of Group B, which is composed of Belarus, Great Britain, Greece, and Turkey. In February 2022, following a 3–1 record in the first four matches, Serbia secured their place in the second round of the FIBA Basketball World Cup 2023 European qualifiers.

Results by round

Latvia home game 

Latvian guard Rihards Lomažs scored 33 points including six of theirs 16 three-pointers, but it was still Serbia who were left celebrating at the end of a thrilling duel in the Aleksandar Nikolić Hall, Belgrade. In his debut at the Serbia's bench, Svetislav Pešić oversaw his side's 101–100 triumph sealing victory in the closing seconds to start their quest towards the 2023 FIBA Basketball World Cup. Latvia looked to be heading to a big victory as triple after triple rained down on the court in Belgrade, but the hosts stayed alive and overturned a 93–88 deficit with three minutes to go. Serbia took the lead inside the final minute and had another chance after Latvia leveled with Serbian forward Marko Jagodić-Kuridža sinking the decisive free throw for the win. Serbian guard Miloš Teodosić came off the bench with a typically instrumental performance to contribute an efficient 21 points along with 9 assists and was backed up by a string of valuable displays, including that of Aleksa Avramović, who had 17 points, 7 assists, 5 rebounds and 3 steals. The game was played at a frantic pace and both teams shot above 70-percent from inside the arc and in a game of small margins, Serbia out-rebounded their opponents 29–20 and had the edge on second chance points at 11–6. Latvia had the lead for over 25 minutes, but not when it counted as the final buzzer sounded. Plenty to build from for both sides and Serbia will be mightily relieved to get off to a winning start.

In after-game interviews, Serbian players dedicated their victory to Stevan Jelovac, a former Serbian national team player who suffered a brain hemorrhage during an AEK practice session ten days prior to the game.

Belgium road game 

Forward Alen Smailagić was ruled out of the roster due to injury. He was replaced by center Filip Petrušev.

In the battle to finish the first window with a 2–0 record, it was Belgium who prevailed to overcome Serbia in a 73–69 victory for a perfect start to their 2023 FIBA Basketball World Cup European Qualifiers campaign. Belgian guard Sam Van Rossom stepped up to drain the go-ahead triple inside the final minute and added a late free throw to ice the game as Belgium produced a final flourish to take early control of Group A as the leaders. Serbia were in the ascendancy early on and moved 36–22 ahead in the second quarter and were still ahead by double-digits late in the third. There was a brief delay before the start of the fourth and Belgium resumed reinvigorated with a 12–2 start to take the lead and they would come through an exciting finish. Belgian center Ismaël Bako starred for the Belgian Lions with 14 points, 11 rebounds, 5 assists and 2 steals in an action-packed display, while Van Rossom top scored with 20 points and was clutch in the closing minutes to help secure the victory. Serbia finished 57 percent from inside the arc, but their struggles from outside amplified in the final quarter as they missed all nine attempts from three-point range and were held to 3-of-15 overall in the fourth. Two from two for Belgium is the dream opening, while Serbia were on the wrong end of another close encounter to finish the November window at 11.

Slovakia home game 

Serbia dropped Slovakia to 0–3 with a 75–63 win behind Aleksa Avramović's 14 points. Forward Marko Jagodić-Kuridža scored 13, as did guard Jovan Novak.

Slovakia road game

Once again, Serbia did not have things all their own way as Slovakia pushed them even closer in Levice before they prevailed for a 71–63 success. Serbian guard Aleksa Avramović played a leading role with 24 points, 6 assists and 3 rebounds in 30 minutes with teenage forward Nikola Jović stepping up with a contribution of 13 points and 7 rebounds amongst the starting five. Center Dušan Ristić was the third - and final - Serbian player in double figures with 12 points on 6-of-9 shooting to go with 8 rebounds and the starting center gave deserving praise to the opposition.

Latvia road game

Latvia produced an impressive defensive display with a 66–55 victory over Serbia to the delight of their home fans, in Riga. While points may not have been accumulated as easily as they did in the first meeting in November, there was still little to separate the teams in a tightly contested first half. Serbia had opened up a nine-point lead at 34–25 before momentum swung in favor of Latvia with a 26–4 spell across quarters with the visitors held to just 10 points in 15 second-half minutes. Forward Artūrs Kurucs sparked the pivotal run in the third quarter with back-to-back threes for Latvia and finished with a team-high 13 points along with 4 rebounds and 6 assists in an all-round display. Latvian centers Klavs Cavars and Anžejs Pasečņiks shared 19 points and 5 blocks between them as they set the tone in the paint in the defensive effort. Serbia were held to just 59 points – their lowest total in the World Cup Qualifiers – as they shot an uncharacteristic 21-of-60 from the field. An NBA forward Nemanja Bjelica was restricted to just a solitary point and guard Aleksa Avramović was unable to add to his first-half tally of 16 points. Just what Latvia needed. If Belgium advance, as expected, then Luca Banchi's side will enter the Second Round at 2–2. Meanwhile, early concern for Serbia as they now head back home with added pressure on their reverse fixture with Belgium.

Belgium home game
The game was held in the Čair Sports Center, Niš. The game, originally scheduled for 3 July 2022 at 21:00, was postponed due to a lighting issue with just three minutes played and Belgium leading 6–3, and rescheduled to 4 July 2022 at 19:00. The game was resumed with 7:54 to play in the first quarter and the score of 6–3 in favor of Belgium.

Serbia and Belgium started their duel on Sunday, and saw it finish more than 24 hours later on Monday. Serbia held a 10-point lead with just four minutes left to play, but they learned a lesson about a typical Dario Gjergja-coached team, be it on national team level or on the club level. His teams are stubborn. If Gjergja is on the sideline, don't expect the white towel at any point. Guard Manu Lecomte came up big in the clutch minutes. At 71–61 from Serbia's point of view, the Belgian comeback started with a Hans Vanwijn layup. Forward Maxime De Zeeuw knocked down a triple on the next offense. Lecomte added another one two possessions later. Lecomte got an and-one to complete the 11–0 run which got Belgium the lead heading into the last 120 seconds of the game. Serbia did briefly retake the lead on Ognjen Jaramaz's free throws. But with the game on the line, Lecomte get the game-winning layup to set the final score at 74–73 about 26 hours after the tip-off.

Second round – Group I 

In February 2022, following a 3–1 record in the first four matches, Serbia secured their place in the second round of the FIBA Basketball World Cup 2023 European qualifiers. They play against top three finishers of Group B, Great Britain, Greece, and Turkey. In March 2022, the fourth contestant of Group B, Belarus was expelled from the competition following the Russian invasion of Ukraine. As only three teams played in the Group B, after the disqualification of Belarus, the result of the qualified teams from Group A against the last-placed team will not be carried over. Following two losses in August 2022, Serbia advanced to the second round with a 1–3 record.

Results by round

Greece home game 

Serbia got their bid to reach next year's FIBA Basketball World Cup back on track with an important 100–94 overtime triumph against Greece in front of a European Qualifiers record crowd of 19,150. In a battle of two recent back-to-back NBA Most Valuable Players, it was Serbian center Nikola Jokić who prevailed over Greek forward Giannis Antetokounmpo as bottom beat top to open up Group I in the Second Round. Serbia had the lead for 41–23 of an enthralling contest, while Greece were only ahead for just over a minute. The depth for the hosts told with 33 points off the bench as they needed important contributions following an injury to Serbian guard Vasilije Micić, who had started well. The Serbians had been ahead for the majority of the contest and moved up by 10 in the fourth before Greece rallied to make it a one-possession game. Serbia made some big shots, but Greek guard Tyler Dorsey tied the game with a corner triple to force overtime. It was Serbia who made the first move in the extra period and this time, they were able to close it out. Jokić paced Serbia with 29 points, 8 rebounds and 6 assists in the win, but there was a telling contribution off the bench from guard Ognjen Jaramaz: 15 points on 6-of-8 shooting including a huge three down the stretch in regulation. It was enough to fend off Giannis' European Qualifiers record-breaking effort of 40 points along with 8 boards and 5 assists. The Jokic-Giannis battle was epic and attention quickly turns to Sunday's games with Serbia visiting Turkey with the chance to move into the top three.

Turkey away game 

Serbia produced a near flawless first half as they led by 19 points as Serbian forward Nikola Kalinić beat the buzzer from inside his own half. However, Turkey rallied through their star trio of Cedi Osman, Furkan Korkmaz, and Alperen Şengün as they eventually tied the game at 72–72. Kalinić responded with a huge triple before a later offensive putback from Serbian center Nikola Jokić put the finishing touches on the win. Jokić made it look easy at times and put together a clinic in the paint with 19 points on 8-of-10 shooting in just 11 minutes of action in the first half. It was a slightly different story after the break as Jokić mostly sat on the bench watching Serbia's huge lead evaporate, but came up with an important score late on to finish with 24 points and 10 rebounds. There were also telling contributions from Kalinić and guard Marko Gudurić. Turkey's starters combined for 65 of their 72 points but ran out of steam down the stretch after a huge effort in the second half. The hosts were down at 27 percent from three-point range and it was Serbia who made the big shots count in the final two minutes of the game. Serbia scored the final seven points of the game to fend off an epic fightback from Turkey and win 79–72 on the road. The Serbians managed to prevent another famous sporting comeback in Istanbul to complete a perfect window having seen a lead as large as 21 points wiped out in the second half. The August window was bordering on make-or-break for Serbia with huge games with Greece and Turkey – they've beaten them both and reignited their campaign to move back to .500. In contrast, back-to-back defeats for Turkey dent their hopes of making it to the World Cup with a 2-4 record with the reverse fixture taking place in the next window in November.

Great Britain away game

Turkey home game

Greece away game

Great Britain home game

Awards 
Gamedays First Team

Statistics

Player statistics

See also 
 Italy team for FIBA World Cup 2023 qualification

Notes

References

External links

Serbia Qualifiers Profile at the FIBA Website

2021
2021–22 in Serbian basketball
2022–23 in Serbian basketball
2023 FIBA Basketball World Cup